Pahalwan Saheb is a book based on the life of heroic freedom fighter of India Bhagwat Rai as known as Pahalwan Saheb written by Manoj Kumar Rai.

Content
In this book author mention the life of Bhagwat Rai, he showed astonishing and miraculous power by making many records in youth.
Bhagwat Rai ji had fought the British by opening a circus company in the country before independence.

Release and reception
Pahalwan Saheb is a Bhagwat Rai's biography who was a symbol of courage, inspiration of young revolutionaries and a great freedom fighter of India. The book was published on his 121st birth anniversary 21 March 2021 by Prabhakar Prakashan and released by Maharastra's Chief Minister Shree Uddhav Thackeray this book has 203 pages.

References

21st-century history books
Indian biographies